The Imamate of Aussa also spelled Imamate of Awsa was a medieval Harari imamate in present-day eastern Ethiopia with its capital in Asaita. It was carved out of the Sultanate of Harar and the Adal Sultanate.

History
This polity was marred with internal conflicts between Harla and Arabs. In 1647, the rulers of the Emirate of Harar broke away to form their own polity. Harari imams continued to have a presence in the southern Afar Region until they were overthrown in the eighteenth century by the Mudaito dynasty of Afar who later established the Sultanate of Aussa. The last ruler of the dynasty, Imam Selman was killed in 1750. According to Heloise Mercier, the inhabitants of Harar who had migrated to Aussa were unable to maintain their customs and dialect contrary to those who lingered in Harar. Enrico Cerulli asserts although Aussa became dominated by Afar people, the ancient Semitic speaking Muslim kingdom survived in the form of the Emirate of Harar post 1700s. According to professor Lapiso, the contemporary Semitic Harari people are the heirs of the former Aussa Adal state which subjugated the Cushitic Afar and Somali people.

Rulers

See also
Aussa Sultanate
Mudaito dynasty
Sultanate of Ifat
Ajuran Sultanate

References

16th century in Ethiopia
17th century in Ethiopia
Former countries in Africa
Former monarchies
Former theocracies